Nyamyn Jargalsaikhan (born 24 August 1955) is a Mongolian wrestler. He competed in the men's Greco-Roman 57 kg at the 1976 Summer Olympics.

References

1955 births
Living people
Mongolian male sport wrestlers
Olympic wrestlers of Mongolia
Wrestlers at the 1976 Summer Olympics
Place of birth missing (living people)